Pedro Kozak (January 11, 1949 – May 31, 2020) was an Argentine former footballer and football manager who played in the Argentine Primera División and the National Soccer League.

Career  
Kozak played in the Argentine Primera División with Club Atlético Lanús. In 1973, he played abroad in the National Soccer League with Toronto Italia. In 1974, he played with league rivals Toronto Hungaria, and in 1975 he signed with the Serbian White Eagles where he assisted in securing the NSL Cup. In 1976, he played with Toronto Panhellenic. In 1982, he played with NSL expansion franchise Dinamo Latino.

He died on May 31, 2020.

Managerial career 
In 1982, he later served as the head coach for Dinamo Latino in the National Soccer League. The following season he was the head coach for the Toronto Italia youth team. In 1985, he was the technical director for Toronto Dinamo. In 1987, he served as the head coach for the North York Rockets in the Canadian Soccer League. In November 1987, he was named the technical director for the Ontario under-14 team.

In 1990, he served as an assistant coach under Tony Taylor for the Toronto Blizzard. In 1992, he was promoted to the head coach position for the Toronto Blizzard. The following season he managed the Blizzard in the American Professional Soccer League. In 1994, he was named the head coach for Chattanooga Express in the United States Interregional Soccer League.

In 1997, he formed the Premier Soccer Academy in Chattanooga, Tennessee.

References 

1949 births
2020 deaths
Argentine footballers
Argentine football managers
Club Atlético Lanús footballers
Toronto Italia players
Serbian White Eagles FC players
Argentine Primera División players
Canadian National Soccer League players
American Professional Soccer League coaches
Canadian National Soccer League coaches
Association footballers not categorized by position